Keene Holbrook Curtis (February 15, 1923 – October 13, 2002) was an American character actor.

Early life
Curtis was born in Salt Lake City, Utah, to Polley Francella (née Holbrook), a teacher, and Ira Charles Curtis, a railway and civil service employee. He attended Davis High School in Kaysville, Utah, then enlisted in the U.S. Navy and served three years in the Pacific Theater during World War II. After Curtis returned home, he attended the University of Utah where he earned a bachelor's degree. In 1943, he was recognized by Theta Alpha Phi national honorary dramatic society as the university's outstanding actor.

Film
Curtis made his film debut in the 1948 Orson Welles' adaptation of Macbeth. Additional film credits included American Hot Wax, Rabbit Test, The Buddy System, I.Q., Heaven Can Wait, Sliver, and Richie Rich's Christmas Wish.

Curtis was a member of the Church of Jesus Christ of Latter-day Saints.

Theatre work
Curtis' theatrical career began as a in 1949 as an assistant stage manager for the Martha Graham Dance Company before working on Broadway productions. His first appearance as a performer was in a 1965 revival of You Can't Take It with You. In 1971, he was awarded the Tony Award for Best Featured Actor in a Musical for The Rothschilds. Additional Broadway credits included The Cherry Orchard, A Patriot for Me, Via Galactica, Annie, Night Watch (played Curtis Appleby in 1972 production) and La Cage aux Folles. He was a member of the Stratford Festival of Canada acting company in 1981, playing Sir George Thunder in Wild Oats.

Television work
Curtis had a recurring role playing John Allen Hill, the owner of Melville's Restaurant in Cheers and as a wealthy banker on the short-lived Bea Arthur vehicle, Amanda's. His many television credits include The Magician as quirky columnist Max Pomeroy opposite Bill Bixby, Gypsy starring Bette Midler and appearances on:

Animation work
For the animated series SWAT Kats: The Radical Squadron, he voiced the character the Pastmaster. He also provided the voice of Grand Moff Tarkin for the radio adaptation of Star Wars Episode IV: A New Hope, but may have been best known for voicing "Lord Balthazar" in The Smurfs from 1981-89.

He also used his voice talents for other cartoon shows including The Little Mermaid, The Dukes, The Scooby & Scrappy-Doo/Puppy Hour, Bill and Ted's Excellent Adventures, Trollkins, The Adventures of Don Coyote and Sancho Panda,  The Greatest Adventure: Stories from the Bible, Denver, the Last Dinosaur, The Snorks, The Jetsons, Space Stars, Adventures from the Book of Virtues, The Herculoids, Fantastic Max, Paddington Bear, The Centurions, Kissyfur, Mother Goose and Grimm, The Hot Rod Dogs and Cool Car Cats and Bonkers.

Death
Curtis died from complications from Alzheimer's disease in a Bountiful, Utah nursing home, aged 79, and was buried at Bountiful Memorial Park.  Curtis never married and had no children.  He is survived by his sister-in-law and several nieces and nephews.

References

External links

 

1923 births
2002 deaths
American male film actors
American male musical theatre actors
American male stage actors
American male television actors
American male voice actors
Male actors from Salt Lake City
Tony Award winners
Deaths from Alzheimer's disease
Neurological disease deaths in Utah
Burials in Utah
Latter Day Saints from Utah
20th-century American singers
20th-century American male actors
20th-century American male singers